The 2018 Papa John's Pizza Tankard, the provincial men's curling championship of New Brunswick was held February 7 to 11 in Miramichi, New Brunswick.  The winning James Grattan rink represented New Brunswick at the 2018 Tim Hortons Brier in Regina.

Teams
The teams are listed as follows:

Round robin standings

Scores

February 7
Draw 1
Cain 7-5 Sullivan
Mallais 10-6 Odishaw
Grattan 9-2 Robichaud
Tallon 7-4 Jones

Draw 2
Odishaw 8-3 Jones
Grattan 11-7 Cain
Mallais 8-3 Tallon
Sullivan 10-2 Robichaud

February 8
Draw 3
Mallais 7-3 Grattan
Tallon 9-4 Robichaud
Sullivan 11-10 Jones
Odishaw 6-4 Cain

Draw 4
Odishaw 6-5 Tallon
Jones 8-4 Mallais
Cain 6-3 Robichaud
Grattan 8-2 Sullivan

February 9
Draw 5
Sullivan 6-5 Mallais
Robichaud 8-5 Odishaw
Grattan 7-4 Jones
Tallon 7-2 Cain

Draw 6
Tallon 7-4 Grattan  
Jones 9-5 Cain 
Odishaw 8-6 Sullivan  
Robichaud 6-3 Mallais

February 10
Draw 7
Jones 8-6 Robichaud
Sullivan 7-6 Tallon 
Mallais 9-7 Cain
Odishaw 6-5 Grattan

Playoffs

Semifinal
February 10, 8:00

Final
February 11, 2:00pm

References

2018 Tim Hortons Brier
Curling competitions in New Brunswick
Sport in Miramichi, New Brunswick
2018 in New Brunswick
February 2018 sports events in Canada